McDonogh 35 Senior High School is a charter public high school in New Orleans, Louisiana. It is a part of New Orleans Public Schools and InspireNOLA charter operator. The school was named after John McDonogh.

History

Prior to 1917, during the era of segregated school systems in the Southern U.S., no public high school existed in New Orleans for African-American pupils. Those interested in pursuing an education beyond the eighth grade had to attend one of the city's three private secondary schools for blacks: Leland College, New Orleans University, or Straight College.

In 1917, a group of citizens met to petition the Orleans Parish School System to convert McDonogh 13 Boys' School from a white elementary school to a secondary educational facility for black pupils. The petition was granted and in the fall of 1917, McDonogh 35 Senior High School became recognized as a four-year high school. McDonogh 35 remained the only public four-year high school for African Americans until the L. B. Landry transitioned from an elementary into a high school in 1942. Booker T. Washington also opened its doors in 1942 for African Americans.

Over the years, McDonogh 35 has changed its location four times. The original building at 655 South Rampart Street was destroyed when Hurricane Betsy struck New Orleans in 1965, and for the next four years the school was temporarily located in the former United States Federal Court House Building at 600 Camp Street. In 1969, students and faculty were moved into the school facility at 133 St. Ann Street that formerly housed McDonogh 41 Elementary School. In September 1972, the facility relocated to 1331 Kerlerec Street in the Tremé neighborhood. During the 1992-1993 school year, McDonogh 35 was recognized as a National Blue Ribbon School of Excellence by the United States Department of Education.

By April 13, 2006, McDonogh 35 was one of six public high schools that had re-opened since Katrina. Of them, it was the only one in a Downtown neighborhood. According to Philip White, the principal, initially the administration had plans to accommodate 800 students but found fewer due to the effects of the hurricane. One month later, the enrollment went over 1,000 students and the administration was forced to stop accepting students.

The current facility which opened on August 20, 2015 is located on 16 acres in the Bayou District at 4000 Cadillac Street, the former Phillips/Waters school site. The Louisiana Recovery School District allocated $55 million in Federal Emergency Management Agency recovery funds tied to this site to construct the new state of the art McDonogh 35 College Preparatory High School.

On December 20, 2018, the Orleans Parish School Board awarded the InspireNOLA charter group a two-year management contract to operate McDonogh 35 College Preparatory High School, which will only have eleventh and twelfth grades. Once the students graduate, that school will close.

The school board also announced that InspireNOLA was awarded a contract to create a charter high school on the same campus. In 2019, McDonogh 35 College Preparatory Charter High School will start with ninth grade and add a grade each year until it reaches twelfth grade.

The "Roneagle"
A "Roneagle" or "Ironeagle" is a mythical bird fashioned after the American bald eagle however because of its solid iron constitution, it was stronger, swifter, larger and more resourceful than all other birds—a symbol of strength and courage meant to inspire the students of the school.  This is the emblem and mascot of McDonogh 35 Senior High School; the "I" was later intentionally dropped to make it easier to pronounce. The first issue of the school's yearbook in 1928 describes the mythical creature.

Academics
Christine Woyshner and Chara Haeussler Bohan, editors of Histories of Social Studies and Race: 1865-2000, said that "Despite the pressures of a state-mandated standardized curriculum and a corresponding accountability policy, in the late twentieth and early twenty-first centuries, McDonogh 35 retained a strong academic curriculum that placed social justice and students at its center.

Athletics
McDonogh 35 College Preparatory Charter athletics competes in the LHSAA.

Notable alumni

McDonogh 35 College Preparatory High School
 Delvin Breaux, NFL cornerback
 Carlos Henderson, NFL wide receiver

McDonogh 35 Senior High School
 Joan Bernard Armstrong, first female elected judge in Louisiana and first African American chief judge of the Louisiana 4th Circuit Court of Appeals
 Israel Meyer Augustine Jr., first black elected judge of Orleans Parish Criminal District Court
 Wesley T. Bishop, Senator, Louisiana State Senate
 James Carter (class of 1987), former Councilman, City of New Orleans
 Rev. Abraham Lincoln "A.L." Davis, founder of Southern Christian Leadership Conference and first black city councilman in New Orleans
 Michael S. Harrison (class of 1987), Superintendent, New Orleans Police Department
 Morris F.X. Jeff Sr., former head of New Orleans Recreation Department's "colored" division
 Jason Hughes, member of the Louisiana House of Representatives
 Geneva Handy Southall (class of 1941), musician, musicologist, professor, and writer
 D. Antoinette Handy (class of 1946), musician, scholar, author, former National Endowment for the Arts director of music 
 Jared Brossett (class of 2000), Councilman, City of New Orleans
 Punkie Johnson (class of 2003), actress and stand-up comedian, current featured player on Saturday Night Live
 Dr. Janina Jeff (class of 2003), geneticist and host/executive producer of In Those Genes podcast
 Chris Clark (class of 2003), NFL offensive tackle 
 Darryl Kilbert (class of 1974), former Superintendent of Orleans Parish School Board
 Dr. Calvin Mackie (class of 1985), motivational speaker and entrepreneur
 Ernest Nathan Morial, first African-American mayor of New Orleans (1978–86) 
 Representative Sandra Seals-Hollins (class of 1988), first African-American woman elected to the Utah State Legislature
 Marguerite Berry Polk Math Educator graduating Southern University 1955 being the first to teach New Math in Orleans Parish School system. Help established the Zeta Phi Beta Chapter at Southern University of New Orleans campus, and mother of Ernest Polk
 Ernest Polk (class of 1981) former Corporate Executive Shell Oil Company awarded The Laurel Society Top Marketer of the year 1994, Music Producer, arranger, and performer, Created Outthebox.com internet portal, RockinSoul Music, New Breed Companies, and was awarded special recognition by the Fritz Pollard Alliance that promotes diversity in hiring in the NFL. 
 Michael Smith (class of 1997) NFL reporter for ESPN 
 Neil Smith (class of 1984), NFL defensive end and two-time Super Bowl champion
 Darryl Willis, Vice President in charge of claims for BP in the Deepwater Horizon oil spill
Carlton G. Smith (class of 1986), Major General, U.S. Army

Further reading

References

External links
 McDonogh 35 High School website
 

Charter schools in New Orleans
Preparatory schools in Louisiana
Public high schools in New Orleans
Educational institutions established in 2019
2019 establishments in Louisiana